András Stieber (born 8 October 1991) is a Hungarian footballer who plays as a midfielder for Haladás.

Club career
In 2017, Stieber signed for Gyirmót.

On 23 February 2022, Stieber joined Haladás on a 1.5-year contract.

Personal life
Stieber is the younger brother of Hungarian international Zoltán Stieber, who also began his career at Goldball '94 and later played for the Aston Villa Under-21s with András.

Career statistics

References

External links
 

1991 births
Living people
People from Sárvár
Hungarian-German people
Hungarian people of German descent
Hungarian footballers
Hungary youth international footballers
Association football midfielders
Újpest FC players
Győri ETO FC players
Lombard-Pápa TFC footballers
FC Ajka players
Budaörsi SC footballers
Gyirmót FC Győr players
Mosonmagyaróvári TE 1904 footballers
Szombathelyi Haladás footballers
Hungarian expatriate footballers
Expatriate footballers in England
Hungarian expatriate sportspeople in England
Nemzeti Bajnokság II players
Nemzeti Bajnokság I players
Sportspeople from Vas County